This is a list of lists of rulers and office-holders of Serbia throughout history.

Heads of state
List of presidents of Serbia
List of prime ministers of Serbia
Historical
List of Serbian monarchs
List of heads of state of Yugoslavia
List of presidents of Serbia and Montenegro

Heads of subdivisions
Middle Ages
List of rulers of Duklja
List of rulers of Zeta
List of rulers of Travunia
List of rulers of Zachumlia

Nobility

Magnates of the Fall of the Serbian Empire
Serbian nobility during Ottoman administration
Nobility of the Serbian Revolution
Nobility of the Principality of Serbia

Theological
List of heads of the Serbian Orthodox Church
List of metropolitans of Montenegro (Prince-Bishops after 1697)

Other
List of Serbian regents
List of local rulers of Vojvodina

See also
Lists of office-holders

Lists of European rulers
Political history of Serbia